Elaeocarpus foveolatus, commonly known as white quandong or northern quandong, is a species of flowering plant in the family Elaeocarpaceae and is endemic to Queensland. It is a medium-sized tree, sometimes with buttress roots at the base of the trunk, variably-shaped leaves with serrated edges, flowers with five petals often with a few short lobes or teeth on the tip, and elliptic to oval fruit.

Description
The leaves often develop domatia and have wavy-toothed edges. There are more than fifty stamens and the ovary is hairy.

Taxonomy
Elaeocarpus foveolatus was first formally described in 1866 by Ferdinand von Mueller in Fragmenta Phytographiae Australiae from material collected by John Dallachy in mountains near Rockingham Bay. The specific epithet (foveolatus) means "minutely pitted".

Distribution and habitat

Conservation status
White quandong is listed as of "least concern" under the Queensland Government Nature Conservation Act 1992.

References

Oxalidales of Australia
foveolatus
Flora of Queensland
Plants described in 1866
Taxa named by Ferdinand von Mueller
Endemic flora of Australia